The Elder Scrolls Renewal Project (TESRenewal) is a fan volunteer effort to recreate and remaster the video games in The Elder Scrolls series. The team is best known for its Skywind project, which seeks to recreate the 2002 The Elder Scrolls III: Morrowind on the 2016 The Elder Scrolls V: Skyrim: Special Edition game engine, known as the Creation Engine.

History 
The Renewal Project began with Morroblivion, a Morrowind remaster on the 2006 The Elder Scrolls IV: Oblivion engine, prior to Skyrims release. Coordinated through the Morroblivion website's forums, the mod was publicly available on the team's website in 2008. 

In 2012, after the release of Skyrim, forum members began work on Skywind, intending to begin the same result in the Skyrim engine. 

Another volunteer team works separately on Skyblivion, a similar but separate project to remaster Oblivion on the more advanced Skyrim engine.

Skywind 
Skywind is a recreation of Morrowind (2002) in the Skyrim – Special Edition game engine (2016). All original game assets, including textures, music, quests and gameplay, were planned to be redesigned. The remastering team involves over 70 volunteers in artist, composer, designer, developer and voice acting roles, who released several videos highlighting their development progress. In November 2014, the team reported to have finished half of the remaster's environment, over 10,000 new dialogue lines and three hours of series-inspired soundtrack. Players were able to download and play an unfinished version of the release until late 2014, when the volunteer team chose to divert assets to development instead of user support.

A March 2015 update showed updated levels. The developers wrote that they were not close to a release despite technical indications from their project's version number. In mid-2015, the team released its public alpha, an unfinished test version, but it was soon withdrawn. After a year, the project team released its fourth update, which was designed to solicit volunteers for the remaining work. In October 2018, a further major trailer was released and another in July 2019 and January 2020.

Skyblivion 

Skyblivion is a recreation of The Elder Scrolls IV: Oblivion (2006) within the engine for The Elder Scrolls V: Skyrim – Special Edition (2016). Like its sister project, it involves an overhaul of most aspects of the original game, including landscaping, weapons, and armors. 

As of mid-2014, the project sought outside help from visual artists and declined voice actors, as Oblivion already featured a full voice cast. The team released a development trailer in May 2014 that showed the remaster in early development and a gameplay trailer a year later. As of 2015, the game lacked navmesh, a mechanism by which non-player characters wander an environment without becoming lost in other assets. In November 2016, Rebelzize started to send out invites on Nexus Mods in the hope of attracting more volunteers. More people joined and not much later the "Skyblivion – Return To Cyrodiil" trailer was published resulting in an influx of new volunteers.

By August 2019, the project started to near its completion, with the exterior map in its final stages of development, 3D assets being implemented at a rapid rate and debugging being done for the quests.

See also 
 Enderal – a total conversion mod sequel to Nehrim, created in the Skyrim engine
 Skyrim mods

References

External links 
 
 Skywind official website
 Skyblivion official website

Fangames
The Elder Scrolls mods
Video game remaster mods